Janet Theresa Neff (born April 8, 1945) is a Senior United States district judge of the United States District Court for the Western District of Michigan.

Early life and education
Born in Wilkinsburg, Pennsylvania, Neff graduated from University of Pittsburgh with her Bachelor of Arts degree in 1967 and later from Wayne State University Law School with a Juris Doctor in 1970.

Legal career
Following law school graduation, Neff was an assistant city attorney for the city of Grand Rapids, Michigan, from 1971 to 1973. She was in private practice in Michigan from 1973 to 1978 and from 1980 to 1988. She was a Commissioner, Michigan Supreme Court from 1978 to 1980. She became an Assistant United States Attorney of the U.S. Attorney's Office, Western District of Michigan in 1980. She was a judge on the Michigan Court of Appeals from 1989 to 2007.

Federal judicial career
Neff was nominated to the United States District Court for the Western District of Michigan by President George W. Bush on March 19, 2007 to a seat vacated by David McKeague. Despite the blocking of her confirmation vote by U.S. Senator Sam Brownback from Kansas because she had attended a same-sex commitment ceremony, Neff was confirmed by the Senate on July 9, 2007 by a 83–4 vote. She received her commission on August 6, 2007. She assumed senior status on March 1, 2021.

Notable cases

She has generated controversy over her stance over a federal gun control issue caused by Kent County Sheriff Larry Stelma over his comments that he "will not abide by or enforce federal law which he determines to be unconstitutional".

In 2015, Judge Neff dismissed a lawsuit against Eaton County, MI. The lawsuit was brought by the family of two murder victims, Michael and Terri Greene, who were murdered during a home invasion by an Eaton County jail inmate, Christopher Perrien, who was released by the jail each day to go to a work release job at a company that did not exist. The county failed to verify that the company was real before releasing Perrien on work release status.

In 2017, Judge Neff sentenced serial sexual predator and former United States Gymnastics doctor Larry Nassar to 60 years in federal prison.

In September 2019, Neff sentenced child sex trafficker Ricardo Urbina to 40 years in prison.

On June 29, 2020, Neff ruled that Michigan's independent re-districting commission is constitutional, in a blow to the state GOP.

On December 2, 2020, Neff declined to sanction the Trump campaign over an alleged disinformation tactic.

In January 2021, Neff dismissed a lawsuit brought by 10 former Michigan officials who sought to overturn term limits for state offices.

References

External links

1945 births
Living people
21st-century American judges
21st-century American women judges
Assistant United States Attorneys
Judges of the United States District Court for the Western District of Michigan
Michigan Court of Appeals judges
People from Wilkinsburg, Pennsylvania
United States district court judges appointed by George W. Bush
University of Pittsburgh alumni
Wayne State University alumni